Simplicio de Castro (January 13, 1914 – January 1942) was a Filipino boxer who competed in the 1936 Summer Olympics. In 1936 he was eliminated in the quarterfinals of the welterweight class after losing his fight to Roger Tritz.

De Castro fought for his country during World War II and had the rank of lieutenant. He was part of the 1st Infantry Regiment under Alfredo Santos. He was killed in action during the 1942 Battle of the Pockets in Bataan.

References

External links
 
Simplicio de Castro's profile at Sports Reference.com
Mention of Simplicio de Castro's death

1914 births
1942 deaths
Welterweight boxers
Olympic boxers of the Philippines
Boxers at the 1936 Summer Olympics
Filipino male boxers
Filipino military personnel killed in World War II